Defensin, alpha  4 (DEFA4), also known as neutrophil defensin 4 or HNP4, is a human defensin peptide that is encoded by the DEFA4 gene. HNP4 is expressed in the granules of the neutrophil where it defends the host against bacteria and viruses.

Function 
Defensins are a peptide family of cytotoxic microbicides involved in innate immunity. Members of the defensin family are distinguished by a conserved six-cysteine motif. Several human alpha defensin genes including HNP4 are clustered on chromosome 8. DEFA4 differs from other defensin genes by an extra 83-base segment that is apparently the result of a recent duplication within the coding region. HNP4 inhibits corticotropin-stimulated corticosterone production.

References

Further reading 

 
 
 
 
 
 
 
 
 
 
 
 
 

Defensins